Ralph Allen School in Combe Down, Bath, England, is a co-educational, comprehensive secondary school with academy status. Located on the south-eastern edge of Bath, the school educates 11 to 18-year-olds from Bath and the surrounding area.

History
The school was built and named in 1957 to commemorate Ralph Allen (1693-1764). It opened in 1958.

Awards
In 2004, the school gained specialist Science College status, and has also been recognised by Artsmark Silver, Investors in People, Investors in Student Careers, Schools for Health, Partnership Promotion School and Sportsmark Gold awards.

Partnerships
The school is part of the Bath Education Trust, working closely with other local schools, colleges, universities and businesses. It also works closely with the James Dyson Foundation, and is part of the Active Transport to Schools project.

Notable alumni
Jeremy Guscott, rugby player
Scott Sinclair, football player
Serena Guthrie, netball player
Danny Wallace, comic writer
Jake Sinclair, football player
Fergus Feilden, architect
Chris Lawrence (visual effects), CG Supervisor on 'Gravity'

References

External links
Ralph Allen School Website

Secondary schools in Bath and North East Somerset
Academies in Bath and North East Somerset
Schools in Bath, Somerset
Combe Down